Manilyn Reynes-Jimenez (born April 27, 1972), simply known as Manilyn Reynes, is a multi-awarded Filipino actress, singer, television host and commercial model. In the Philippines, Reynes has been referred to as "The Star of All Decades", and is one of the most notable horror queens, establishing her as a Filipino pop culture icon.

Reynes’ vocal talent also catapulted her to enormous prominence. She was one of the pioneers on the popular musical program That's Entertainment. She has released twelve studio albums including Manilyn, featuring her signature hit “Sayang na Sayang”. Additionally, she was also noted for being the youngest artist who ever held a concert at the Big Dome in 1990.

Reynes has received numerous accolades throughout her career, including a FAMAS Award, a Metro Manila Film Festival Award, and three PMPC Star Awards for Television.

Personal life
Reynes is married to actor Aljon Jimenez in 1996.

Filmography

Film

Television

Discography

Albums

Apple Thoughts (1983)
Manilyn... Christmas (1985)
Triplets (1986)
Manilyn Reynes (1989)
Heartbeat (1989)
Gugma (1990)
High Energy (1990)
Still in Love with You (1992)
Mula sa Puso (1993)
Voices (1995)
True Love Ways (1996)
Manilyn Reynes Ultimate Collection (2000)
Once More (2002)
Meant to Be (Original Motion Picture Soundtrack) (June 15, 2017) (GMA Records)
Inday Will Always Love You Theme Song (June 5, 2018) (GMA Records)

Awards

References

External links

Living people
20th-century Filipino actresses
21st-century Filipino actresses
20th-century Filipino women singers
21st-century Filipino women singers
Actresses from Cebu
Filipino child actresses
Filipino women pop singers
Filipino film actresses
Filipino television actresses
Filipino television personalities
Singers from Cebu City
That's Entertainment (Philippine TV series)
That's Entertainment Tuesday Group Members
Visayan people
1972 births